= Francesco Aureri =

Italian sculptor

Francesco Aureri (active 1568–1578) was an Italian sculptor of the Renaissance period, active in Cremona.
